The Copyright Tribunal in the United Kingdom has jurisdiction over some intellectual property disputes under the Copyright, Designs and Patents Act 1988. The tribunal's principal task is adjudicating disputes between collective licensing agencies (such as the Copyright Licensing Agency) and persons (natural or legal) who consider they have been unreasonably refused a licence or offered unreasonable terms.

In 2010 the Copyright Tribunal was listed as to be 'Abolished with Reservations' under the 2010 UK quango reforms.

See also
Australian copyright law#Copyright Tribunal

References

United Kingdom copyright law
United Kingdom tribunals